Hiro may refer to:

Arts and entertainment
 Hiro (film), a Canadian short film
 Hiro (TV channel), an Italian channel
 "Hiro's Song", by Ben Folds
 "Yuko and Hiro", a Blur song
 "Letter from Hiro", a song by The Vapors, off New Clear Days
 Hiro, the main character of Darling in the Franxx
 Hiro Amanokawa, the main character of Digimon Ghost Game

People
 Hiro (given name)
 Hiro (photographer) (1930–2021), Japanese-born American photographer
 Kazu Hiro (born 1969), American prosthetic makeup artist
 Hiroshi "Hiro" Kawaguchi (composer) (born 1965), Japanese composer
 Hiro-x (born 1980), a Japanese singer and modern J-pop artist.

Places
 Hiro Hachiman Shrine, a Shinto shrine located in Hirogawa, Wakayama Prefecture, Japan
 Hiroshima, a city in Japan
 Hiro Naval Arsenal at Kure, Hiroshima

Other uses
 Hiro (unit) a Japanese unit of length, 1.8 m (a fathom)
 Hiro H2H, a Japanese patrol flying boat of the 1930s
 Hiro Type 94, a W-18 liquid-cooled aircraft engine

See also
 Hiros (TV episode) 2008 season 1 episode 5 of the NBC fantasy-sci-fi TV series Heroes
 HiROS (High Resolution Optical System) German spy satellite
 Hero (disambiguation)
 Hiroo (disambiguation)
 Hirohi